Chaudhry Rahmat Ali (16 November 1897 – 3 February 1951) was a  Pakistani nationalist who was one of the earliest proponents of the creation of the state of Pakistan. He is credited with creating the name "Pakistan" for a separate Muslim homeland in South Asia and is generally known as the originator of the Pakistan Movement.

Chaudhry Rehmat Ali’s seminal contribution was when he was a law student at the University of Cambridge in 1933, in the form of a pamphlet "Now or Never; Are We to Live or Perish Forever?", also known as the "Pakistan Declaration".
The pamphlet was addressed to the British and Indian delegates to the Third Round Table Conference in London. The ideas did not find favour with the delegates or any of the politicians for close to a decade. They were dismissed as students' ideas. But by 1940, the Muslim politics in the subcontinent came around to accept them, leading to the Lahore Resolution of the All-India Muslim League, which was immediately dubbed the "Pakistan resolution" in the Press.

After the creation of Pakistan, Ali returned from England in April 1948, planning to stay in the country, but his belongings were confiscated and he was expelled by the prime minister Liaqat Ali Khan. In October 1948, Ali left empty-handed. He died on 3 February 1951 in Cambridge "destitute, forlorn and lonely". The funeral expenses of insolvent Ali were covered by Emmanuel College, Cambridge on the instructions of its Master. Ali was buried on 20 February 1951 at Cambridge City Cemetery.

Education and career 

Rahmat Ali was born in November 1897 into a Punjabi Gujjar Muslim family of the Ghaursi clan, in the town of Balachaur in the Hoshiarpur District of Punjab in British India. After graduating from Islamia College Lahore in 1918, he taught at Aitchison College Lahore before joining the Punjab University to study law. However, in 1930 he moved to England to join Emmanuel College Cambridge, in 1931. Subsequently, he obtained a BA degree in 1933 and MA in 1940 from the University of Cambridge. In 1933, he published a pamphlet, "Now or Never", coining the word Pakistan for the first time. In 1943, he was called to the Bar, from Middle Temple, London. Rahmat Ali finished his education in England, obtaining MA and LLB with honours from the universities of Cambridge and Trinity College Dublin. In 1946, he founded the Pakistan National Movement in England. Until 1947, he continued publishing various booklets about his vision for South Asia. The final Partition of India disillusioned him due to the mass killings and mass migrations it ended up producing. He was also dissatisfied with the distribution of areas between the two countries and considered it a major reason for the disturbances.

Philosophy 
Ali's writings, in addition to those of Muhammad Iqbal and others, were major catalysts for the formation of Pakistan. He offered the name "Bangistan" for a Muslim homeland in the Bengal region, and "Osmanistan" for a Muslim homeland in the Deccan. He also suggested Dinia as a name for a South Asia of various religions.

Conception of 'Pakistan' 
In 1932, Ali moved to a house in Cambridge, on 3 Humberstone Road. It was in one of the rooms of this house that he is said to have written the word 'Pakistan' for the first time. There are several accounts of the creation of the name. According to a friend, Abdul Kareem Jabbar, the name came up when Ali was walking along the banks of the Thames in 1932 with his friends Pir Ahsan-ud-din and Khwaja Abdul Rahim. According to Ali's secretary Miss Frost, he came up with the idea while riding on the top of a London bus.

Sir Mohammad Iqbal said that Rahmat Ali visited him in London when he was there for the First Round Table Conference in 1930 and asked him what he would call the government of the Muslim state he had proposed in Allahabad. Iqbal told him that he would call it "Pakistan" as an acronym based on the provinces' names.

On 28 January 1933, Ali voiced the idea in a pamphlet titled "Now or Never; Are We to Live or Perish Forever?". The word 'Pakstan' referred to "the five Northern units of India, viz., Punjab, North-West Frontier Province (Afghan Province), Kashmir, Sindh and Baluchistan".
By the end of 1933, 'Pakistan' had become common vocabulary, and an i was added to ease pronunciation (as in Afghan-i-stan). Ali also wrote that this would be followed by "reintegration with the three Muslim 'Asian' homelands of Afghanistan, Iran and Tukharistan", a reference to Northwest India's political, historical and cultural affiliations with West Asia.

In a subsequent book, Ali discussed the etymology in further detail:
'Pakistan' is both a Persian and an Urdu word. It is composed of letters taken from the names of all our South Asia homelands; that is, Punjab, Afghania, Kashmir, Sindh and Balochistan. It means the land of the Paks – the spiritually pure and clean.

Historian Aqeel Abbas Jafari has argued that the name "Pakistan" was invented by a Kashmir Journalist, Ghulam Hassan Shah Kazmi on July 1, 1928, when he moved an application before the government in Abbottabad seeking a sanction for publishing a weekly newspaper, "Pakistan". This was probably the first time, the word Pakistan was used in the subcontinent. Choudhry Rahmat Ali is said to be suggested the name of the independent Muslim state Pakistan in 1933, 5 years after the name was adopted by Ghulam Hasan Shah Kazmi for his newspaper.

Ali's pamphlet described the Muslims of his proposed 'Pakistan' as a 'nation', which later formed the foundation for the two-nation theory of the All-India Muslim League:

Ali believed that the delegates of the first and second Round Table Conferences committed 'an inexcusable blunder and an incredible betrayal' by accepting the principle of an All-India Federation. He demanded that the national status of the 30 million Muslims of the northwestern units be recognized and a separate Federal Constitution be granted to them.

Ali's biographer, K. K. Aziz writes, "Rahmat Ali alone drafted this declaration" (in which the word Pakistan was used for the first time), but to make it "representative" he began to look around for people who would sign it along with him. This search did not prove easy, "for so firm was the grip of 'Muslim Indian Nationalism' on our young intellectuals at English universities that it took me (Rahmat Ali) more than a month to find three young men in London who offered to support and sign it." Later on, his political opponents used the name of these signatories and other friends of Ali, as creators of the word 'Pakistan'.

Opposition to "Indianism" 
According to his writings, "Indianism" meant emphasizing the abode and culture of the "caste Hindus" as the primary and essential constituent of a subcontinent-wide nation. It was in his view Indianism was "the designation of a State created by the British for the first time in history", citing that the All-India National Congress being established in 1885 as evidence that Indianism originated in the hands of the British in the service of British imperialism. He criticizes the notion of the unity of "the country of India"; instead he considers it a continent with a wide variety of nations, ethnicities and religions, and that the Muslims, Sikhs, the Marathas, the Akhoots(untouchables) and the Rajputs were in fact separate nations, on whom the fetters of "Indianism" were fastened by imposing on all of them this "preposterous prefix of All-India".

Iqbal and Jinnah

On 29 December 1930, Muhammad Iqbal delivered his presidential address, wherein he said:

According to some scholars, Iqbal had not presented the idea of an autonomous Muslim State; rather he wanted a large Muslim province by amalgamating Punjab, Sindh, NWFP and Baluchistan into a big North-Western province within India. They argue that Iqbal never called for any kind of partition of the country.

On 28 January 1933, Choudhry Rehmat Ali voiced his ideas on 'Pakistan'. By the end of 1933, the word "Pakistan" became common vocabulary where an "I" was added to ease pronunciation (as in Afghan-i-stan).
In a subsequent book Rehmat Ali discussed the etymology in further detail:
"'Pakistan' is both a Persian and an Urdu word. It is composed of letters taken from the names of all our South Asia homelands; that is, Punjab, Afghania, Kashmir, Sindh and Balochistan. It means the land of the Pure".

Jawaharlal Nehru had written in his book on the scheme: "Iqbal was one of the early advocates of Pakistan and yet he appears to have realised its inherent danger and absurdity. Edward Thompson has written that in the course of the conversation, Iqbal told him that he had advocated Pakistan because of his position as President of the Muslim League session, but he felt sure that it would be injurious to India as a whole and Muslims especially."

In 1934, Choudhry Rahmat Ali and his friends met Muhammad Ali Jinnah and appealed for his support of the Pakistan idea. He replied, "My dear boys, don't be in a hurry; let the waters flow and they will find their own level."

Proposed maps and names

Ali had published several pamphlets where he listed himself as the "Founder of the Pakistan National Movement", In these pamphlets Ali had added various maps of the subcontinent with potential names that the new proposed nation might have according to him. Haideristan, Siddiqistan, Faruqistan, Muinistan, Maplistan, Safiistan and Nasaristan were some of these names. Safiistan and Nasaristan nations were proposed on the map of Sri Lanka.

In his maps he had renamed the Indian subcontinent as 'Pakasia' and more often as 'Dinia', (an anagram of "India" with position of 'd' changed). Dinia was represented with dependencies Pakistan, Osmanistan (representing Hyderabad Deccan and neighbouring areas) and Bangistan (representing Bengal). He proposed the former Muslim provinces of Eastern Bengal and Assam in East India to become Bangistan, an independent Muslim state for Bengali, Assamese and Bihari Muslims. He proposed the princely Hyderabad State, to become an Islamic monarchy called Osmanistan. Ali also renamed the seas around the Indian subcontinent, and referred the seas around landmass of Dinia as the Bangian, Pakian and Osmanian seas that were his proposed names for the Bay of Bengal, Arabian Sea, and the Indian Ocean respectively.

These alternate geographical maps of the subcontinent were followed by the mention of Chaudhry Rehmat Ali’s position as the "founder of the Siddiqistan, Nasaristan and Safiistan National Movements".

Mian Abdul Haq, a contemporary of Rahmat Ali at the University of Cambridge, stated that, after 1935, Rahmat Ali's mental makeup changed resulting from a study of "major Nazi works, of which he knew many passages by heart".

After the creation of Pakistan 
While Choudhry Rahmat Ali was a leading figure for the conception of Pakistan, he lived most of his adult life in England.

After the partition and creation of Pakistan in 1947, Ali returned to Lahore, Pakistan on 6 April 1948. He had been voicing his dissatisfaction with the creation of Pakistan ever since his arrival in Lahore. He was unhappy over a smaller Pakistan than the one he had conceived in his 1933 pamphlet. He condemned Jinnah for accepting a smaller Pakistan, calling him "Quisling-e-Azam".

Ali had planned to stay in the country, but he was expelled out of Pakistan by the then Prime Minister Liaqat Ali Khan. His belongings were confiscated, and he left empty-handed for England in October 1948.

Death

Ali died on 3 February 1951 in Cambridge. According to Thelma Frost, he was "destitute, forlorn and lonely" at the time of his death. Fearing (correctly) that he may have died insolvent, the Master of Emmanuel College, Cambridge, Edward Welbourne, instructed that the College would cover the funeral expenses. He was buried on 20 February at Cambridge City Cemetery in Cambridge, England. The funeral expenses and other medical expenses were repaid by the High Commissioner for Pakistan in November 1953, after what was described as a “protracted correspondence” between the London office and the relevant authorities in Pakistan.

Legacy 
Rahmat Ali is credited by Pakistanis for having coined the term "Pakistan" and envisioning a separate state for Muslims. Beyond that, his ideas are not explored in any detail.

Works
 Now or Never; Are We to Live or Perish Forever?, also known as the "Pakistan Declaration", (1933)
What Does the Pakistan National Movement Stand For? (Cambridge: Pakistan National Movement, 1933)
Letters to the Members of the British Parliament (Cambridge, 8 July 1935)
Islamic Fatherland and the Indian Federation: The Fight Will Go On for Pakistan (Cambridge: Pakistan National Movement, 1935) 
Letter to The Times, 8 December 1938
The Millat of Islam and the Menace of Indianism (Cambridge: Pakistan National Movement, 1942)
The Millat and the Mission: Seven Commandments of Destiny for the 'Seventh' Continent of Dinia (Cambridge: Pakistan National Movement, 1942) in which Rahmat Ali proposed relabeling the Indian subcontinent as its anagram Dinia. The word Dinia was made by moving the letter d that appears in the middle of the word 'India' to the beginning. 
The Millat and her Minorities: Foundation of Faruqistan for the Muslims of Bihar and Orissa (Cambridge: The Faruqistan National Movement, 1943)
The Millat and her Minorities: Foundation of Haideristan for Muslims of Hindoostan (Cambridge: The Haideristan National Movement, 1943)
The Millat and her Minorities: Foundation of Maplistan for Muslims of South India (Cambridge: The Maplistan National Movement, 1943)
The Millat and her Minorities: Foundation of Muinistan for Muslims of Rajistan (Cambridge: The Muinistan National Movement, 1943)
The Millat and her Minorities: Foundation of Siddiqistan for Muslims of Central India (Cambridge: The Siddiqistan National Movement, 1943)
The Millat and her Minorities: Foundation of Safiistan for Muslims of Western Ceylon (Cambridge: The Safiistan National Movement, 1943)
The Millat and her Minorities: Foundation of Nasaristan for Muslims of Eastern Ceylon (Cambridge: The Nasaristan National Movement, 1943)
The Millat and her Ten Nations: Foundation of the All-Dinia Milli Movement (Cambridge: The All-Dinia Milli Movement, 1944)
Dinia: The Seventh Continent of the World (Cambridge: Dinia Continental Movement, 1946)
India: The Continent of Dinia, or the Country of Doom (Cambridge: Dinia Continental Movement, 1946)
The Pakistan National Movement and the British Verdict on India (Cambridge: Pakistan National Movement, 1946)
Pakasia: The Historic Orbit of the Pak Culture (Cambridge: The Pakasia Cultural Movement, 1946)
Osmanistan: The Fatherland of the Osman Nation (Cambridge: The Osmanistan National Movement, 1946)
The Greatest Betrayal: How to Redeem the Millat? (Cambridge: Pakistan National Movement, 1947)
Pakistan: The Fatherland of the Pak Nation, (Cambridge: Pakistan National Liberation Movement, 1947)
The Muslim Minority in India and the Saving Duty of the U.N.O. (Cambridge: The All-Dinia Milli Liberation Movement, 1948)
The Muslim Minority in India and the Dinian Mission to the U.N.O. (Cambridge: The All-Dinia Milli Liberation Movement, 1949)
Pakistan or Pastan? Destiny or Disintegration? (Cambridge: The Pakistan National Liberation Movement, 1950) 
Complete Works of Rahmat Ali, ed. Khursheed Kamal Aziz (Islamabad: National Commission on Historical and Cultural Research, 1978)

See also
 Indian Independence Movement
 Muslim nationalism in South Asia
Pakistani nationalism
 All India Muslim League
Muslim League (Pakistan)
 Punjab Muslim League
Qazi Abdur Rehman Amritsari

Notes

References

Bibliography

External links 

1897 births
1951 deaths
Alumni of Emmanuel College, Cambridge
Members of the Middle Temple
People from British India
Leaders of the Pakistan Movement
People from Nawanshahr
Pamphleteers
University of the Punjab alumni
Academic staff of Aitchison College
Pakistan Movement activists from Punjab
Burials at the Cambridge City Cemetery
Government Islamia College alumni
Punjabi people
Expatriates of British India in the United Kingdom